James Dennis Alan Hamlin (born November 18, 1980) is an American professional stock car racing driver and NASCAR team owner. He competes full-time in the NASCAR Cup Series, driving the No. 11 Toyota Camry for Joe Gibbs Racing. He co-owns and operates 23XI Racing with the basketball Hall of Famer Michael Jordan. He has won 48 NASCAR Cup Series races, including the Coca Cola 600 in 2022 and the Daytona 500 in 2016, 2019, and 2020; he is the fourth person to win the race in back-to-back seasons, alongside Richard Petty, Cale Yarborough, and Sterling Marlin.

His strongest season was in 2010, where he was leading the championship by 15 points heading into the final race at Homestead. Despite this and having won the most races of any driver in that year (8), he would lose the championship by 39 points to Jimmie Johnson. Except for the 2013 season, in which a collision with Joey Logano damaged his lower back and kept him out for a large part of the early season, Hamlin has competed in the NASCAR Cup Series playoffs in every season he has competed full-time (15 seasons as of 2021), including his rookie season in 2006 when he finished third in the Chase for the NASCAR Nextel Cup standings, capping off one of the most impressive rookie campaigns in modern NASCAR history. In 2023, he started a weekly podcast with Dirty Mo Media called Actions Detrimental with Denny Hamlin every Monday morning. The podcast includes content from the previous Cup Series race, weekly fan questions in a segment named "Dear Denny" and also other race insights from Hamlin.

Early life and career

Beginnings
Hamlin was born in Tampa, Florida and lived in Chesterfield, Virginia for most of his childhood. Hamlin began his racing career in 1988, at the age of 7 years old, racing go-karts. By 1997 at 15, he won the WKA manufacturers cup.  At the age of 16, he was racing mini stocks. In his first stock car race, at Langley Speedway, Hamlin won the pole position and won the race. He then progressed to the Grand Stock division in 1998 and moved on to Late Model Stock Cars in 2000. In 2002, he won ten Late Model races and surpassed that in 2003 with 25 wins, and 30 poles, out of 36 races. In 2004, while competing full-time in Late Model Stock Cars, Hamlin was signed to a driver development contract with Joe Gibbs Racing.

NASCAR career

2004–2006

In 2004, Hamlin competed in five NASCAR Craftsman Truck Series races with EJP Racing and had a tenth-place finish in his NASCAR debut at Indianapolis Raceway Park. He later ran his first career ARCA RE/MAX Series race at Talladega Superspeedway, finishing third in the No. 10 Pontiac owned by Andy Hillenburg. His final start of the year came at Darlington Raceway when he made his Busch Series debut. He started twenty-seventh (rain-out) but finished eighth in the No. 18 Joe Gibbs Driven Performance Oil Chevrolet.

Hamlin ran the full season in 2005 after he replaced Mike Bliss in the No. 20 Rockwell Automation-sponsored Chevrolet in the Busch Series. He ended up finishing fifth in the final championship points standings as a rookie in that series, with 11 Top 10's and earnings of $1,064,110.  Hamlin also ran his first NASCAR Cup Series races in 2005, making his Cup debut at Kansas Speedway as the driver of the No. 11 FedEx-sponsored Chevrolet for the 2006 season, after Jason Leffler was released, and made seven starts in the Cup series in 2005. He finished the Cup season with three Top 10 finishes in those seven starts and one pole at Phoenix International Raceway.

In 2006, Hamlin ran his first full season in the NASCAR Nextel Cup Series, and during the year he drove in both the Nextel Cup and Busch Series full-time. In Hamlin's first restrictor-plate race as a Nextel Cup driver, he beat all the previous year's (2005 season) pole winners in the 70-lap 2006 Budweiser Shootout. Hamlin became the first Rookie of the Year candidate to take home the Shootout victory. Hamlin achieved his first career Busch Series victory at Autodromo Hermanos Rodriguez (March 5). On June 11, 2006, Hamlin scored his first career Cup Series win at the Pocono 500, where he also won his second career pole.  He achieved his second career win on July 23, 2006, in the Pennsylvania 500 also at Pocono Raceway becoming only the 2nd rookie in Nextel Cup history to sweep both races at a track during the same season (Jimmie Johnson did so at Dover International Speedway in his rookie season in 2002), both from the pole position. In the Cup Series, Hamlin won the Raybestos Rookie of the Year award and finished third in the final Cup standings, scoring the highest points finish for a rookie in the modern era of NASCAR, and the highest since James Hylton in 1966. Hamlin thus became the first-ever rookie to make the Chase for the NEXTEL Cup, which he finished third in points.

2007–2008

Hamlin started the 2007 Cup season by finishing 28th in the Daytona 500. He won his third career Cup race at the Lenox Industrial Tools 300 at New Hampshire International Speedway. Following that race, Hamlin finished 43rd in the Pepsi 400 at Daytona International Speedway after being involved in a wreck early on in the event. This was the first-ever 43rd-place finish in his career.

Hamlin clinched a spot in the Chase for the Cup and was seeded sixth, 50 points behind the leader, but finished 12th overall in the final standings. In the Nationwide Series, Hamlin scored three victories including Darlington, Michigan, and Dover in the No. 20 Rockwell Automation Chevy. He also finished 1st at Milwaukee, but Aric Almirola started the car and ran 60 laps before turning it over to Denny Hamlin. Almirola received the points, purse, and got credit for the win.

In 2008, Hamlin had a near-identical season as before, but moved up to eighth in points, and won early in the season at Martinsville Speedway. He led 381 out of 410 laps in the 2008 Crown Royal Presents the Dan Lowry 400, the most dominant effort of a driver since 2000, but cut a tire and finished 24th. He won four races in the Nationwide Series, driving both the No. 18 and No. 20 entries for Gibbs, as well as the No. 32 Dollar General/Hass avocados-sponsored car for Braun Racing.

2009

He continued driving the No. 11 car in Sprint Cup in 2009, as well as sharing the No. 20 car for Joe Gibbs Racing in the Nationwide Series. Hamlin won his fifth Cup career race at Pocono Raceway on August 3, 2009. Hamlin boldly stated at the final restart "I'm going to win this race."  He followed through on the statement, moving from sixth to first and snapping a 50 race winless streak. The win was Hamlin's third at Pocono.  It was especially emotional for the No. 11 team as Hamlin had lost his grandmother, Thelma Clark, that Friday.

Hamlin once again dominated the race at Richmond International Raceway and finally won at his home track.  On October 25, 2009, Hamlin held off Jimmie Johnson to win the TUMS Fast Relief 500 at Martinsville Speedway. He went on to win the Ford 400 at the 2009 NASCAR Sprint Cup Series Finale at Homestead-Miami Speedway, capping off his 2009 season 5th in the overall standings with 4 wins, 15 top 5s, and 20 top 10s. Hamlin took the lead after starting the race in the 38th position and he led a total of 70 laps to capture his 4th win of the 2009 season.

2010

Hamlin entered the 2010 season with great expectations. Many believed he would be a favorite to unseat Jimmie Johnson as Sprint Cup Champion. On January 22, 2010, Hamlin tore the anterior cruciate ligament in his left knee while playing basketball. The decision was made to postpone his surgery until after the season. Hamlin announced on March 27, 2010, to have surgery on his left knee the following Monday. The decision was made to prevent further damage to his knee.

On March 29, 2010, Hamlin won the rain-postponed race at Martinsville Speedway in wild fashion. He beat his Joe Gibbs Racing teammate, Joey Logano, and Jeff Gordon to the finish line. Two days later, Hamlin had knee surgery to repair the torn ligament in his left knee.

On April 19, 2010, three weeks after his surgery, Hamlin worked his way from a 28th starting spot to restart 2nd with 13 laps to go at Texas Motor Speedway. Hamlin was later able to pass Jeff Burton on the outside and hold off Jimmie Johnson to get his 10th career win and his second win in three races.

Less than three weeks later on May 8, Hamlin visited victory lane for the third time in 2010 at Darlington Raceway. He swept the weekend by winning both the Sprint Cup and Nationwide series events. He became the first driver to do so at Darlington since Mark Martin in 1993. He won the Nationwide Series Royal Purple 200 presented by O'Reilly Auto Parts driving the No. 20 for Joe Gibbs Racing on Friday night. He started on the pole and led the most laps to win the race.

Hamlin started 8th in Saturday night's Showtime Southern 500 and went on to lead 108 laps and take the checkered flag. A few races later, Hamlin dominated at The Gillette Fusion ProGlide 500 Presented By Target at Pocono Raceway, leading the most laps on his way to gathering his 12th career win, his 4th win of the season, and his fourth win at Pocono. A week later, Hamlin set a career-high fifth win of the season, when he won at Michigan International Speedway after starting 7th.

Later in the 2010 season, Hamlin finished 43rd in the Emory Healthcare 500 at Atlanta Motor Speedway. This dropped him five spots in the Chase standings, placing him in 10th overall. Despite the drop in the standings, the top 10 drivers in the Chase were locked in after Atlanta, guaranteeing Hamlin a spot in the 2010 Chase for the Sprint Cup.
A driver error in the first Chase race on part of Carl Edwards caused Hamlin to spin with 85 to go. With cars ahead running out of fuel, Hamlin barely lost to Clint Bowyer.

In the AAA 400 at Dover International Speedway Hamlin finished the race in 9th and retained the points lead by 35 points over Jimmie Johnson. The following week at Kansas Speedway, Hamlin encountered a rough driving car and finished 12th, a finish that was not good enough to keep the points lead, and fell into a deficit of 8 points to Jimmie Johnson, who finished 2nd. Then the following week at California he finished in the top 10 but still lost points to the 48 car of Jimmie Johnson.

At Charlotte Motor Speedway, Hamlin led a lap (his first lead in the Chase) and finished in 4th, one spot behind points leader Jimmie Johnson, and lost another 5 points. But the triumph came at the 0.526-mile (paper clip-shaped) Martinsville Speedway; Hamlin came through with his series-leading seventh victory of the season. Hamlin won the pole and led the first 11 laps but encountered tire issues; he dropped back to 17th and finally worked himself up consistently to 5th until lap 471 with 29 laps to go, he took the lead from Kevin Harvick and held off a hard-charging Mark Martin to lead the final 29 laps and take his 3rd straight victory at Martinsville and his 4th at the historic track. He closed the lead to 6 points behind points leader and 5th-place finisher, Jimmie Johnson.

Next up was the Amp Energy Juice 500 at the Talladega Superspeedway. Hamlin started 17th, but fell back and lost the draft. He went a lap down, but when a caution came out, he got the Lucky Dog and was back on the lead lap. He then worked his way up to a 9th-place finish, two spots behind points leader Jimmie Johnson. This put Hamlin another 8 points behind in the standings, totaling 14. Hamlin won the AAA Texas 500 at Texas Motor Speedway and then led the standings by 33 over Johnson with two races to go. Next was Phoenix International speedway. Hamlin started 14th but got up to the front right away and was leading for almost the whole race. With 14 laps to go, Hamlin had to pit because he was short on fuel. He finished 12th. After the race, Hamlin was furious and threw a water bottle in frustration. With one race to go, Hamlin led Johnson by 15 points and was 46 points ahead of Kevin Harvick. In the last race, he lost the lead to Johnson after spinning out and ended up 39 points behind him with a 14th-place finish.

2011

In 2011 Hamlin almost won the Budweiser Shootout, but the victory was taken away from him by Kurt Busch because, at the last second, Hamlin crossed the yellow line, on turn four to the finish line, in his attempt to pass Ryan Newman.

Denny struggled in the first 8 races where his only top 10 was a seventh at Las Vegas. However, when the series got to Richmond, Denny turned on the heat by winning both his charity event and the Nationwide race but would finish 2nd to teammate Kyle Busch. He would go on to finish outside of the top 10 once at Dover finishing in the top 20 and rebounded with finishes of 10th and 3rd at Charlotte and Kansas respectively.

After his 3rd-place finish at Kansas, he would climb to 11th in points – 1 point out of the coveted 10th as the series goes to his favorite track, Pocono, where he would have tied himself for the most all-time wins at the track if he had placed first. After a disappointing 19th-place finish, he moved on to Michigan, a track at which he posted a 1st and 2nd-place finish in 2010. Before the first practice at Michigan, oil pans unapproved by NASCAR were confiscated from the three JGR teams, including Hamlin.

After showing signs of sheer mediocrity during each practice and qualifying, Hamlin qualified 10th in the field. He showed signs of improvement at the very start of the race, Hamlin quickly slid back in the field and was in the 10th to 15th place range until beginning to improve with about 70 laps to go, deeming the adjustment on his loose racecar "a magic adjustment" On lap 158, with 42 laps to go, a penalty caused by an accident between Juan Pablo Montoya and Andy Lally allowed Hamlin to move to the front of the field by short pitting. Another caution on lap 192 moved the 11 car up to the first position. After a restart, Hamlin surged ahead of the group, with Matt Kenseth right behind him in the closing three laps. After desperately trying to move past Hamlin, Kenseth made a final attempt coming out of turn four on the final lap, causing him to almost hit the wall because of a loose race car. This win vaulted Hamlin from 12th in the standings, where he would have been replaced in the chase by Jeff Gordon if each stayed in their current position, to 9th, where he is guaranteed a spot in the chase.  At the end of the season, Joe Gibbs Racing announced that Mike Ford would not return as Hamlin's crew chief in 2012.

2012

Joe Gibbs Racing announced that Darian Grubb will be Mike Ford's replacement as Hamlin's crew chief for the 2012 season. Grubb previously served as crew chief for Tony Stewart, where he helped Stewart to his third Sprint Cup title in 2011.

Hamlin scored his first win of the year in the second event on the schedule, at Phoenix International Raceway. On April 22, 2012, Hamlin out-dueled Martin Truex Jr. to score his second win in the eighth race of the year, at Kansas Speedway. At the Crown Royal Curtiss Shaver 400 at the Brickyard, Hamlin scored his eleventh pole. He won his third race of the year at Bristol Motor Speedway on August 26 in the Irwin Tools Night Race. A week later, he became the first driver of the year to have back-to-back wins, winning the AdvoCare 500 at Atlanta Motor Speedway, again out-dueling Truex. Two weeks later, he dominated and won the Sylvania 300 at New Hampshire Motor Speedway after starting 32nd, deep in the field. This was Joe Gibbs Racing's 100th win in the NASCAR Sprint Cup series.

2013: Missing The Chase And Feud With Joey Logano

Hamlin started the season on a low note, crashing his cars in both the Sprint Unlimited and the Budweiser Duel. The crash in the Duel put him into a backup car for the Daytona 500. Hamlin started 35th, led 33 laps, and finished 14th. He improved the following week, with a third-place finish at Phoenix, then a 15th-place finish at Las Vegas. He led the most laps at Bristol but ran out of gas. The controversy unfolded after Hamlin spun his ex-teammate Joey Logano battling for position. This resulted in Hamlin and Logano exchanging words in the garage after the race.

At Fontana, Hamlin won his first pole for 2013. On the final restart, Hamlin restarted in 12th place, and with 12 laps left Hamlin reached third place before passing Kyle Busch and Kurt Busch for the top 2 spots with Joey Logano. His rivalry with Logano continued as the two fought side by side for the win in the last two laps. Heading into turn 3 on the white flag lap, Hamlin edged in front at the entry, but Logano drifted up the track into Hamlin. In his attempt to correct the car, Hamlin tagged Logano, sending the latter up into the outside wall, while Hamlin came off the banking and smashed head-on into an inside retaining wall. Hamlin's teammate Kyle Busch passed them to win the race.

Although Hamlin climbed out of the car right after the crash, he immediately collapsed and lay on the track. He was airlifted to the hospital as a precaution. When lying in the hospital Hamlin interpreted Logano's post-race words about their battle as Logano saying that he held a grudge against Hamlin and retaliated against Hamlin. It was announced the next day that Hamlin had suffered a massive L1 compression fracture or a collapsed vertebra. Dr. Petty, Hamlin's JGR doctor reported on Tuesday that Hamlin's back would heal in six weeks and Hamlin would need time off. Two of Michael Waltrip Racing's part-time drivers stepped in to replace Hamlin, with Mark Martin filling in at Martinsville and Brian Vickers filling in for four races.  He made his return at Talladega in the Aaron's 499 and told reporters that since he was not ready to run a full race, he would switch with Brian Vickers during the first caution and pit stop by a special exit on the roof attached to the car.

As planned, during a caution, Hamlin switched out with Vickers on lap 23. Under NASCAR rules, since Hamlin started the race, he would receive credit for any results. Vickers got caught up in a 14 car wreck on lap 43, relegating the car to a 34th-place finish.

At Darlington, Hamlin drove his first full race since his injury. He qualified sixth. In the waning laps, he held off Jeff Gordon to finish second to teammate Matt Kenseth.

During the race, Hamlin led six laps and finished in the fourth position.

At Dover, Hamlin started on the pole for the second week in a row. He led 41 laps before he cut a tire on lap 378 and hit the wall, causing him to finish 34th.

At Pocono, Hamlin started in 17th and finished in 8th place. He had shown some recovery.

At Michigan, Sonoma, and Kentucky, Hamlin did not fare well. Finishing in 30th, 23rd, and 35th place. He only got up to 25th in the points standings and 150 points behind 20th place. Without any wins, his chances of making a Wildcard bid for the Chase were nixed.

At Daytona, Hamlin started 24th and led 20 laps, before he got into a wreck off of turn 4 with Juan Pablo Montoya and Martin Truex Jr. Hamlin stayed on the track, a lap down, and got the free pass with the next caution. However, on lap 148, Hamlin hit the tri-oval wall head-on, and then his car was struck by A. J. Allmendinger and went airborne.

He wrecked at Pocono on Lap 15 after losing control of his car in the third turn and solidified his chances of missing the Chase for the first time in his career (He ran 7 races in 2005 but his first appearance was at a Chase race). At Michigan, he was officially eliminated from the Chase even if he won the next four races because he was too far back in the points.

At Richmond, Denny Hamlin got an apology text from Joey Logano for their Auto Club incident, but Hamlin didn't return Logano's text message. In an interview a couple years later, Hamlin said that he thought that Logano was just doing it to ask Hamlin to not interfere with his title hopes, and not because he was genuinely remorseful for what happened. Despite this, Hamlin and Logano said by next season that the feud was over.

Though Hamlin struggled to 23rd-place points finish, the season was not entirely unkind to him, as he won the season finale at Homestead after a fierce battle with Matt Kenseth and Dale Earnhardt Jr. over the last 30 laps.

2014: First Championship 4 Appearance

Hamlin started the 2014 season strong by winning the pole and leading all three segments of the Sprint Unlimited, eventually winning the race. Hamlin then went on to win the second of the Budweiser Duels. In the Daytona 500, Hamlin started third and led for 16 laps, and was the fan-favorite to win the race and sweep all three Sprint Cup events in Speedweeks, but was unable to overtake Dale Earnhardt Jr. in the last two laps and ended up finishing second.

At Auto Club, Hamlin came down with a sinus infection that affected his vision just hours before the race began. A half-hour before the green flag, Joe Gibbs Racing managed to place Sam Hornish Jr. to take over Hamlin's car for the race. Hornish drove the car to a 17th-place finish. The infection was announced a few days later as a piece of metal that had been lodged in Hamlin's eye. At Talladega, Hamlin won the race as the caution flag waved during the last lap.

At the Brickyard 400, Hamlin finished 3rd. However, his No. 11 car failed post-race inspection. NASCAR impounded the No. 11 car and investigated various pieces on it. 2 days later NASCAR suspended crew chief Darian Grubb for six races, fined Grubb $125,000, docked Hamlin 75 driver points and Joe Gibbs 75 owner points, suspended crew chief Wesley Sherrill and put the No. 11 team members on probation until December 31, 2014. Initially, Joe Gibbs and the team decided to appeal the penalties but they changed their minds. On the penalty, Hamlin said, "We'll just simply move forward and not let this affect our performances." Despite the penalties handed to Hamlin's crew, Hamlin would be locked into the 2014 Chase due to his win at Talladega Superspeedway.

Hamlin's spot in the 2014 Chase was sealed up after the 2014 Michigan race with his Talladega win. At Bristol, Hamlin appeared to have a perfect car to win but after leading many laps Hamlin wrecked after contact from Kevin Harvick while racing for the lead. Hamlin replied by angrily throwing his HANS device at Harvick's car during a caution period. Some fans wondered if NASCAR should have penalized Hamlin for exiting his car before the safety workers came out (a rule made by NASCAR in the wake of the big tragedy in which Tony Stewart's car ran over and killed Sprint-Car driver Kevin Ward Jr.) but NASCAR did not penalize Hamlin, stating that safety workers first had told Hamlin to get out of the car by radio and then permitted Hamlin to toss his HANS device at Harvick's car. Harvick later apologized for causing the crash via Twitter while Hamlin said his acceptance of Harvick's apology would only depend on how to clean Harvick would compete with him in the future. Despite him and his team's shortcomings throughout the regular season, Hamlin managed to put together a consistent Chase. His results earned him a spot within the final four title contenders heading to the final round, and he was leading the race and the title with twenty laps to go, but a caution came out and Darian Grubb, his crew chief, decided to opt-out of stopping for fresh tires and fuel, which would turn out to be a costly decision. He finished 7th in the race, and 3rd in the championship.

2015

Hamlin started the season by having to go to the rear in the Budweiser Duels after being penalized during Daytona 500 qualifying.

In the Daytona 500, he came very close for the second year in a row to win the race.  He finished 4th and had one of the best cars of Speedweeks. However, at Atlanta, Hamlin finished 38th after being involved in a wreck with 42 laps to go.  In Las Vegas, he rebounded from his wreck the previous week and finished 5th.  However, at Phoenix, Hamlin did not run well all day leading to a 24th-place finish.

At California, Hamlin had one of the best cars of the race, leading 56 laps, second to Kurt Busch's 61 laps.  A bad pit stop and a bad ensuing restart pushed Hamlin down to 13th, but he rebounded to 3rd place with 20 laps to go.  Hamlin's chances of winning the race ended when he and his crew were penalized for an uncontrolled tire on their pit stop with 20 laps to go making him go to the tail end of the longest line.  He restarted 29th and finished the race 28th.

At Martinsville Speedway, Hamlin stayed up in the top ten nearly all race long. Late in the race, he got penalized for an uncontrolled tire, sending him to the tail end of the field in 31st place. Despite this he formed a tremendous comeback, coming back into the top ten 50 laps later. After a good restart with less than 30 laps to go, Denny Hamlin sealed up his victory, but not before holding off a challenge by rival Brad Keselowski. Hamlin edged Keselowski at the stripe by 0.3 seconds (1 car-length), for his 5th Martinsville victory, leading 91 laps in total. Hamlin, who had feuded with Keselowski during the 2014 Bank of America 500, commended Keselowski for not wrecking him to win the race.

At the spring Bristol race, Hamlin was replaced by Erik Jones after 22 laps due to suffering from neck spasms.

In May, Hamlin won the Sprint All-Star Race after beating Keselowski off pit road during final pit stops. This was not only Hamlin's first All-Star win but also the first JGR and Toyota All-Star win.

After qualifying for the Chase for the NASCAR Sprint Cup, Hamlin won the first race of the Chase at Chicagoland Speedway, which locked him in for the second round of the Chase.

At Talladega in the next round, at the end of the race, his car crashed and caught fire because of being caught up in "The Big One", which eliminated him from the Chase for not having enough points to advance.

2016: First Daytona 500 Win

With new crew chief Mike Wheeler replacing Dave Rogers, Hamlin won the Sprint Unlimited. In the Daytona 500, Hamlin made a pass on Joe Gibbs Racing teammate Matt Kenseth for the lead on the final lap. Hamlin and Martin Truex Jr. were side by side for the win as they crossed the start-finish line, but Hamlin – who led a race-high 95 laps – prevailed by 0.011 seconds over Truex, making it the closest Daytona 500 finish in history, and bringing owner Joe Gibbs his first Daytona 500 victory since 1993. At Martinsville, he was running well until he wrecked after jumping the curb and slamming into the wall and he would finish 39th. Further wrecks occurred at Kansas and Dover.

Hamlin ran both the Cup and Xfinity races during the Coca-Cola 600 weekend, winning in the latter and finishing fourth in the main Cup date. At Michigan in June, he suffered a blown tire with 12 laps remaining. He led Tony Stewart late in the Sonoma race before going wide entering the final corner, causing him to briefly withdraw as he braced for contact with Stewart before losing the win; amid accusations that he had intentionally let Stewart win in his final season, Hamlin clarified he had misjudged the corner entry. Despite the miscue, he rebounded in the season's other road race at Watkins Glen after managing his fuel, a process that was aided by two red flags and eight cautions, for his first road course win.

A third win came in the final race of the regular season at Richmond, a race that he started on the pole and won after holding off Truex and Kyle Larson. However, his Chase hopes were impacted when his engine failed with 26 laps remaining at Charlotte, and he would finish the season sixth in points.

2017

Hamlin had a difficult start to the 2017 season, in which there were many changes to how the races are run (the biggest change being the all-new stage racing). Hamlin picked up an 8th-place finish in Stage 1 of the Daytona 500 but got caught up in one of several 'Big Ones' at the end of Stage 2, caused by a tire blowout on the No. 18 Toyota Camry of Kyle Busch, and would finish the race in 17th. A dismal race in Atlanta followed, with Hamlin retiring from mechanical failures, and he was classified 38th. However, he bounced back in Las Vegas with a sixth-place finish and followed this up with another top-10 result in Phoenix. In the STP 500 at Martinsville, a track on which Hamlin is a 5-time winner, he claimed 2nd place in Stage 1, before suffering from firstly a bad pit strategy and then a collision with Danica Patrick, finishing 30th in the race.

Hamlin's Toyota began to improve dramatically after a mediocre Texas race and, through combining the new-found speed of his JGR car and his limitless talent on short tracks, earned two 8th-place finishes in stages 1 and 2 at Bristol and led a dozen or so laps of the race late on, but was passed by Jimmie Johnson in the final stage and subsequently fell back to finish 10th. He also led 50 laps at his home track at Richmond (also a short track), superbly jumping Brad Keselowski from 2nd place at the 6th restart, and would earn a 3rd-place finish in the race, along with stage points from both stages.

Hamlin's unique skills on restrictor-plate tracks shone through at Talladega Superspeedway the following week. He used pit strategy to take his first stage win of the year in stage 2, and also led more laps than any other driver, but this was not enough to get his first win, as he fell back late in the race. He took his second stage win of the year in Stage 3 of the Coca-Cola 600 in Charlotte and led the last 10 laps of that stage. However, Hamlin restarted poorly from the front and fell back to 10th on the first lap of the final stage. He would recover and work his way through the field, finishing 5th and earning valuable points in the standings.

Hamlin earned a respectable 8th-place finish at a wreck-filled Dover despite getting busted for an uncontrolled tire in Stage 1 and subsequently ran well at Pocono, finishing 12th after falling back late. At Michigan, Hamlin finished 4th after a tense battle with Kyle Larson on the final restart. He then returned to the road course at Sonoma, the scene of his duel with Tony Stewart in 2016 where he was passed on the last corner of the last lap. He led 12 laps during Stage 2 and remained in the top 2 throughout most of the race but he lost grip in his tires towards the end, losing 2nd to Clint Bowyer with 6 laps to go and then 3rd to Brad Keselowski on the final lap, just before the caution waved to end the race after Kasey Kahne crashed on the front straight. He finished 4th, adding to his 5th and 4th places in the two stages earlier in the race.

At Daytona the following week, Hamlin had a very quick car, leading 16 laps during Stage 2 and finishing a very close 2nd to teammate Matt Kenseth in that stage. However, Hamlin's Coke Zero 400 race on the 4th of July weekend ended in frustration as he suffered only his second retirement of the year. Hamlin got caught up in a 3-car incident with 3 laps to go while running 7th. He tried to get moving again before the car erupted into flames, ending his evening.

The next race in Kentucky brought another consistent top-5 weekend, finishing 4th and 5th in the stages and 4th overall, but it was the following week that Hamlin finally broke through. He came from 8th on the grid - finishing every stage in the top 10 (9th and 2nd) to then lead 52 laps on his way to victory in New Hampshire. This win marked Hamlin's 30th NASCAR Cup Series win, his 3rd career Cup victory at Loudon, and JGR's first win of 2017.

A dismal Indianapolis race followed, with a 17th-place finish after a blown tire in overtime cost him a top-5 result. However, Hamlin got back into the top 5 yet again this season at the Overton's 400 in Pocono. The race became all about 4 drivers, as he battled with Kyle Busch, Martin Truex Jr., and Kevin Harvick throughout. Hamlin would end up finishing 4th after leading 18 laps and looking like a real contender to win his second race of the season. Busch went to victory lane, ensuring everyone that JGR was back up to their regular speed. Hamlin continued adding to his impressive amount of top-5 finishes for 2017 the following week, finishing 4th at Watkins Glen, the scene of the first road course victory of his career the year before.

Heading into the next race at Michigan, Hamlin's long-time partner Jordan Fish had reached the end of her pregnancy, and their baby was due at any point. Due to this, NASCAR Camping World Truck Series driver Christopher Bell ran laps in Hamlin's No. 11 Toyota in practice as preparation to step into the car, if Hamlin's girlfriend would go into labor during the weekend. She did not, however, as Hamlin finished the race in 16th due to a bold strategy by the team to stay out on old tires until a caution flew, which did not happen as planned; he pitted just 11 laps from the end, and the caution he needed flew 2 laps later.

Hamlin earned himself a 3rd-place finish at the Night Race at Bristol after a very consistent run. The following week, at Darlington, Hamlin dominated both the Xfinity and Cup races. He outdueled Joey Logano in the Xfinity race on Saturday, using the crossover move on the last corner to cut underneath him and win. In the Cup race, Hamlin's 'Flying 11' was the most consistent and fastest car on the track. After leading 124 laps out of the 367 lap event, he drove on to victory and would get his 2nd win of the season despite a pit road mistake late in the race. However, his car would fail post-race inspection in both races after NASCAR discovered an illegal rear suspension element. Hamlin's wins would be ruled "encumbered" and he was docked 25 points as a result. His crew chief Mike Wheeler was fined $50,000 and suspended for 2 races. The Cup Series event would also mark Hamlin's most recent victory up until the 2019 Daytona 500, 47 Cup races later.

The final race of the regular season at Richmond provided yet another top 5 for the No. 11 car, but it could have been better. Kyle Larson won the race after beating Martin Truex Jr. in overtime, but on the final lap, Hamlin attempted to pass Truex for 2nd and slid his tires, collecting Truex and putting him into the outside wall. Hamlin recovered to finish 5th and later apologized to the 2017 regular-season champion.

The playoffs began very well for Hamlin as he added another top 5 to his amazingly consistent run of late, finishing 4th. This meant that his average finish of 6th over the last 10 races was the best in the field, and put him in an excellent spot going into the 2nd playoff race at New Hampshire, a race that Hamlin won in the summer and has won 3 times overall in his career. Despite his summer win at Loudon, he would finish 12th this time after a pretty average race. At Dover, Hamlin was able to collect stage points to clinch a spot for the Round of 12 but retired from the race with less than 30 to go due to a broken axle.

The Round of 12 began very positively for Hamlin, as he clinched the pole for the Bank of America 500 at Charlotte race, his first pole of the season. He ran up front the entire race, earning useful stage points and eventually a 4th-place finish, which placed him 5th in the standings, 13 points above the cutoff line going into Talladega.

Hamlin started the round of 8 in a controversial Martinsville race, where at 3 laps to go, he bumped Chase Elliott on one of the turns, causing Elliott to spin out. Many fans believed that the wreck was done intentionally, as they booed loudly at Hamlin during his post-race interview. "I got into the back of him and he spun out," Hamlin told NBCSN. "Trying to get a race win... Everybody was doing the same thing. I hate it for his team. I understand they've had a win for a long time coming, but this is for a ticket to Homestead. " At Phoenix, on what it looked like Hamlin was going to get in the Championship 4 after grabbing 19 stage points and a stage win, his chances backfired as he slammed the wall with under 45 laps to go after contact from Chase Elliott, and did not make it to the final round as a result.

2018: First Winless Season

Hamlin started the 2018 season with a third-place finish at the 2018 Daytona 500. Despite being winless throughout the regular season, he made the playoffs by staying consistent with seven top-fives and 14 top-10s. Hamlin was eliminated in the Round of 16 after finishing out of the top-10 at Las Vegas, Richmond, and the Charlotte Roval. He wound up 11th in the final point standings, his first time outside the top ten since the year he missed four races due to injury (2013) and winless for the first time in his career, snapping a 12-season streak of winning at least one race dating back to his first full-time rookie year (2006) when he swept both Pocono races to when he won the July New Hampshire race along with his second Southern 500 (2017).  Hamlin's long-time rival, Jimmie Johnson, also did not secure a win in the 2018 season.

2019: Return to the Championship 4 

Hamlin started the 2019 season by breaking a 47-race winless streak with his second Daytona 500 win, first Cup Series win for new crew chief Chris Gabehart, along with dedicating the victory to the late J. D. Gibbs. He scored his second win of the season at Texas. At the spring Dover race, Hamlin was rushed to the infield care center for carbon monoxide poisoning after an accident knocked out his car's right rear crush panel and allowed fumes inside the cabin. Despite this setback, he stayed consistent throughout the regular season, scoring two more wins at Pocono and the Bristol Night Race. Despite a 19th-place finish at the Charlotte Roval, Hamlin collected enough points to advance to the Round of 12. At Martinsville, Hamlin collided with Logano on turn four, squeezing Logano into the outside wall and causing him to lose a tire and spin out two laps later. Hamlin finished fourth while Logano salvaged an eighth-place finish. After the race, Hamlin and Logano had a discussion on the incident before Logano slapped Hamlin's right shoulder, sparking a fight between the two. NASCAR suspended Dave Nichols Jr., the No. 22 team's tire technician, for one race for pulling Hamlin down to the ground during the altercation.

On November 1, Hamlin revealed that he has a torn labrum in his left shoulder and would have it surgically repaired after the 2019 season. Despite this, Hamlin went on a tear during the Playoffs, scoring his fifth victory of the season at Kansas only two weeks prior and ultimately advancing to the Championship 4 for the first time since 2014 with his sixth victory of the year at Phoenix, his second victory at the track since 2012 and the second time in his career that he had won at least six times in a season (having won eight races in 2010). At Homestead, however, Hamlin was a non-factor for the victory and Championship despite starting from the pole as he led only 2 laps, made an unscheduled pit stop to fix overheating issues after gambling with extra nose tape, and only recovered from a lap down to finish the race in 10th-place. He finished the season fourth in points in his first season with Gabehart as crew chief, a 7-spot improvement over the previous season along with six victories after being winless the year prior.

At the Xfinity level, Hamlin also won the Darlington race but was disqualified after his car failed to meet height requirements during post-race inspection. As a result, second-place finisher Cole Custer was declared the official race winner.

2020: Third Championship 4 Appearance

Hamlin won his third Daytona 500 in 2020 when he beat Ryan Blaney to the finish in overtime by 0.014 seconds, the second-closest finish in the race's history behind Hamlin's 2016 win. The victory was overshadowed by Ryan Newman's wreck coming to the finish that resulted in hospitalization, sparking controversy over Hamlin's post-race burnouts while Newman's health was unknown; Hamlin and Joe Gibbs apologized for the celebrations, the former explaining he had not learned of Newman's status until he was in Victory Lane.

He dominated in wins at Darlington, Homestead, Pocono, and Kansas. At Homestead, he started on the pole and won both stages before winning the race, earning an immaculate 60 points in the standings. At Pocono, he followed up the first race of the doubleheader in which he finished second behind a noticeably slower Harvick with a win in which he stayed out late in the cycle and pitted under green in the first place and kept the lead after the pit. After Kansas, he took the lead in most wins with 5. He and Chris Gabehart were the teams to beat. With his win at Pocono, Hamlin passed Mark Martin for second most wins by any driver that had never won the championship.

2021: Fourth Championship 4 Appearance

On August 15, 2021, Hamlin clinched a Playoff berth despite having no wins throughout the Regular Season and finishing 23rd at the Verizon 200 at the Brickyard after being spun out by a penalized Chase Briscoe for the lead during a Green-White-Checkered attempt. Since part-time Cup driver A. J. Allmendinger won the race, this allowed Hamlin to clinch the 16th and final Playoff spot even if he were to remain winless. Afterward, Hamlin once again criticized NASCAR's decision to race in the road-course layout of Indy instead of the track's iconic oval.

On September 5, 2021, Hamlin won the Southern 500 at Darlington for the 3rd time in his career and advanced to the Round of 12 in the Playoffs. Three weeks later, Hamlin won his second race of the season at Las Vegas, his first victory at the track, and advanced to the Round of 8 as a result. He made the Championship 4 for the third year in a row and finished 3rd in the final standings, with 2 wins, 19 top fives, 25 top tens, 1,502 laps led, an average finish of 8.4, and zero DNF's.

2022 

Hamlin started the 2022 season with a 37th place finish at the 2022 Daytona 500. Despite scoring a win at Richmond, he struggled throughout the first 12 races, with four top-20 finishes and four DNFs. On May 3, 2022, Gabehart was suspended for four races due to a tire and wheel loss at Dover.

On April 26, NASCAR announced that Hamlin would be mandated to go to sensitivity training due to a tweet that Hamlin had made. The tweet made fun of Kyle Larson's block on Kurt Busch on the final lap of the 2022 GEICO 500 by using a Family Guy clip that featured an Asian woman driving poorly by not using her turn signals and changing lanes, causing a big accident. The tweet stirred up controversy as Larson was Japanese American. The tweet was made on April 25, and was deleted the same day, with Hamlin putting out a statement: "I took down a post I made earlier today after reading some of the [replies]. It was a poor choice of memes and I saw how it was offensive. It came across totally wrong. I apologize." Hamlin scored his second win of the season at the 2022 Coca-Cola 600. He won at Pocono, but was disqualified and the No. 11 team was served an L1 penalty after a post-race inspection revealed an alteration to the car's front fascia. It was revealed that the lower corners and wheel openings of the front fascia were wrapped with a layer of clear vinyl that was not removed prior to the application of the paint scheme wrap, resulting in a slight irregularity in the car's dimensions. Hamlin became the first NASCAR Cup Series winner to be disqualified since 1960, when Emanuel Zervakis was stripped of his win at Wilson Speedway for an oversized fuel tank. Hamlin was eliminated following the Round of 8 after Ross Chastain overtook him for fourth-place (Brad Keselowski was the initial fourth-place finisher before his disqualification) at Martinsville with an unprecedented maneuver by sliding on the outside wall to slingshot past Hamlin for the final Championship 4 spot of the season, marking the first time that he missed the penultimate round since 2018. He finished the season fifth in the points standings.

2023 
Hamlin began the 2023 season with a 17th place finish at the 2023 Daytona 500. On March 15, he was docked 25 points and fined 50,000 after admitting on his weekly podcast Actions Detrimental that he intentionally wrecked Chastain during the closing laps of the Phoenix race.

23XI Racing
On September 21, 2020, Hamlin and NBA Hall of Famer Michael Jordan announced they would be fielding a single-car team for the 2021 NASCAR Cup Series season, named 23XI Racing with Bubba Wallace driving the No. 23. On October 4, 2021, Wallace earned his first career Cup win at Talladega after the race was shortened due to rain. Wallace is the first Black driver to win a Cup Series race since Wendell Scott in 1963. The team expanded to a two-car operation for the 2022 NASCAR Cup Series season with the addition of the No. 45, driven by 2004 NASCAR Cup Series Champion Kurt Busch with sponsorship from Monster Energy. On May 16, 2022, Busch got 23XI's second career victory at  Kansas Speedway after leading 116 of 267 laps. Bubba Wallace swept the Kansas races for the team that fall, driving the No. 45 in place of Kurt Busch, who was out due to concussion symptoms from a wreck at Pocono during qualifying. In doing so, Bubba became the first African-American to win more than one race in the NASCAR Cup Series. On July 12, 2022, 23XI and Toyota Racing Development announced that Tyler Reddick will join the team full time in 2024. However, when Busch announced on October 16th that he would step away from full-time racing in 2023, it was also announced that the remainder of Reddick's contract with Richard Childress Racing was bought out by 23XI and that he would instead replace Busch in 2023.

Superstar Racing Experience 
On the 1st February 2022, Hamlin announced he would race in the Superstar Racing Experience (SRX) opener at Stafford Motor Speedway.

In media
In 2016, Hamlin was a Fox NASCAR guest analyst for the Xfinity Series race at Talladega. A year later, he returned to Fox for the Cup drivers-only broadcast of the Xfinity race at Pocono, working in the Hollywood Hotel studio alongside Danica Patrick.

Hamlin, along with his Toyota teammates, recorded video clips on how to drive a lap at all of the NASCAR tracks on the 2016 circuit in the video game NASCAR Heat Evolution. He is also featured as one of eight playable drivers on the EA Sports NASCAR Racing arcade game, the only rookie to be featured in the game.

In 2021, Hamlin was featured in Post Malone's new music video for his song "Motley Crew", along with driver Bubba Wallace.

In 2022, Hamlin was on the front cover of Nascar Rivals along with his car.

Personal life

Hamlin is the youngest son of Dennis Hamlin and Mary Lou Clark. He was born in Tampa, Florida, at what is now St. Joseph's Women's Hospital, and moved to Virginia when he was two years old.

Hamlin and Jordan Fish have two daughters together.

Motorsports career results

NASCAR
(key) (Bold – Pole position awarded by qualifying time. Italics – Pole position earned by points standings or practice time. * – Most laps led.)

Cup Series

Daytona 500

Xfinity Series

Camping World Truck Series

 Season still in progress
 Ineligible for series points

ARCA Re/Max Series
(key) (Bold – Pole position awarded by qualifying time. Italics – Pole position earned by points standings or practice time. * – Most laps led.)

References

External links

 
 
 Denny Hamlin at Joe Gibbs Racing

Living people
1980 births
People from Chesterfield, Virginia
Racing drivers from Virginia
NASCAR drivers
Manchester High School (Virginia) alumni
Racing drivers from Tampa, Florida
FedEx people
ARCA Menards Series drivers
Joe Gibbs Racing drivers
Kyle Busch Motorsports drivers